Calycidorididae are a taxonomic family of sea slugs, dorid nudibranchs, marine gastropod molluscs in the superfamily Onchidoridoidea.

Genera
Genera in the family Calycidorididae include:  
 Calycidoris Abraham, 1876   
 Diaphorodoris Iredale & O'Donoghue, 1923

The following genera are currently considered to be synonyms or have been transferred to another family:
 Lamellidoridella Baba, 1938: synonym of Diaphorodoris Iredale & O'Donoghue, 1923

References